This is a list of mayors of the Herisau, Switzerland. The term to designated the mayor of Herisau used to be Gemeindehauptmann, currently Gemeindepräsident.

Herisau
Herisau